Pavlo Mykolayovych Sushko (born 16 November 1979, Khmelnytskyi Oblast) is a Ukrainian politician, film producer. He is a member of the Public Council of the Ukrainian Oscar Committee, member of the European Film Academy, and is the People's deputy of Ukraine elected in the 2019 Ukrainian parliamentary election for Servant of the People.

Biography 
Sushko was born on 16 November 1979 in Khmelnytskyi Oblast and has lived in Kharkiv Oblast since 2000. He graduated with honours from the Bohdan Khmelnytsky National Academy of the State Border Guard (military specialty – tactical and operational officer). Lieutenant Colonel of the Reserve. He held senior positions in the State Border Guard Service of Ukraine (served in the Kharkiv Border Detachment for 14 years) for 18 years.

In 2010 he graduated from the Yaroslav Mudryi National Law University. In 2013 he graduated from the Kyiv National University of Culture and Arts majoring in “Cinema and TV arts” (television director). In 2016 he joined the film company "Solar Media Entertainment" and became the producer of the feature film “DZIDZIO Contrabass” which was the first profitable film in the history of Ukrainian cinema.

Since 2017 he has been lecturing and conducting master classes for students in film production. Since 2017 he has been the member of the Ukrainian Film Academy. In 2018 he was the chairman of the jury of the Zaporizhia International Short Film Festival ZIFF. In 2018 he became a member of the European Film Academy.

In 2018 he founded the Prime Story Pictures film company. In 2018 he was awarded the Golden Spinning Top (Viewer's choice) for the film “DZIDZIO Contrabass”.

Political activity 

 Deputy Head of the parliamentary fraction of the Servant of the People political party
 Deputy Chairman of the Verkhovna Rada Committee for Humanitarian and Information Policy
 Chairman of the Cinematography and Advertisement Sub-Committee of the Committee on Humanitarian and Information Policy of the Verkhovna Rada of Ukraine
 Chairman of the Kharkiv Oblast Regional Organization of the Servant of the People party
 Member of the Ukrainian part of the Inter-Parliamentary Assembly of the Verkhovna Rada of Ukraine and the Seimas of the Republic of Lithuania
 Deputy Co-chairman of the Inter-Parliamentary Liaison Group with the French Republic 
 Member of the Inter-Parliamentary Liaison Group with the United States of America
 Member of the Inter-Parliamentary Liaison Group with the Republic of Poland
 Member of the Inter-Parliamentary Liaison Group with Canada
Deputy Co-chairman of the Inter-Parliamentary Liaison Group with the Swiss Confederation
Deputy Co-chairman of the Inter-Parliamentary Liaison Group with the Federal Republic of Germany

Awards 
The Golden Spinning Top from the Ukrainian Film Academy in the category "Viewer’s choice" as the producer of the film "DZIDZIO Contrabass" (Ukraine. Director O. Borshchevskyi).

Medal "For Honourable Service" of the 3rd degree – awarded by Decree # 347/2009 of the President of Ukraine.

Medals and decorations awarded by Orders of the Head of the State Border Guard Service of Ukraine:

 Medal for Courage in Defending the Ukrainian State Border
 The Golden Spinning Top from the Ukrainian Film Academy in the category “Viewer’s choice” as the producer of the film “DZIDZIO Contrabass” (Ukraine. Director O. Decoration for Honourable Service in the State Border Service of Ukraine
 The Golden Spinning Top from the Ukrainian Film Academy in the category “Viewer’s choice” as the producer of the film “DZIDZIO Contrabass” (Ukraine. Director O. Medal of the State Border Service of Ukraine "For Faith and Fidelity"
 15 years of Honourable Service Medal
 15 years the State Border Service of Ukraine MedalThe Golden Spinning Top from the Ukrainian Film Academy in the category “Viewer’s choice” as the producer of the film “DZIDZIO Contrabass” (Ukraine. Director O. 
 20 Years of Independence of Ukraine Medal
 20 years the State Border Service of Ukraine MedalThe Golden Spinning Top from the Ukrainian Film Academy in the category “Viewer’s choice” as the producer of the film “DZIDZIO Contrabass” (Ukraine. Director O. 
 Border Service Decoration
 Excellent Border Guard Badge of II class 
 20 Years of the Eastern Regional Department Decoration
 20 Years of the Kharkiv Border Detachment Decoration

He was also awarded certificates of merit and diplomas from the commanders of the State Border Service of Ukraine, Khmelnitsky and Kharkiv Regional Administrations.

Reference list

External links 

 

Living people
Ukrainian border guards
Politicians from Kyiv
Ukrainian campaign managers
Servant of the People (political party) politicians
People from Berdychiv
Taras Shevchenko National University of Kyiv, Institute of International Relations alumni
Ninth convocation members of the Verkhovna Rada
21st-century Ukrainian politicians
National Security and Defense Council of Ukraine
1979 births
Ukrainian film producers